The Autopista AP-36 (also known as Autopista Ocaña - La Roda) is an autopista in the community of Castile-La Mancha, Spain. It starts at the junction of the Autovía A-4 and the Autopista R-4 near Ocaña in the province of Toledo, and runs, parallel to the N-301 road, past the towns of Quintanar de la Orden and San Clemente (where it connects with the Autovía A-43), before ending at the Autovía A-31 near La Roda in the province of Albacete. Built to relieve congestion on the Autovía A-3 between Madrid and the A-31, it opened in July 2006.

External links
Autopista AP-36 Official Website

AP-36
AP-36